Right Here is the eighth studio album by the American rock musician Eddie Money. It was released in September 1991 by Columbia Records and yielded four singles, three of which would make the Billboard Hot 100 chart, including the song "I'll Get By" which made it to number 21.  The video for "I'll Get By" is dedicated to the producer Bill Graham who had worked with Money on previous projects.

Reaching only number 160 on the Billboard 200 albums chart, Right Here would be Money's final chart appearance with an album of new material, and his singles from the album would mark his final pop chart appearances.

Track listing

Personnel

Musicians

 Mike Baird – drums, drum programming
 Kim Bullard – keyboards
 Monty Byrom – guitar, keyboards, background vocals
 John Corey – guitar
 Don Cromwell – bass guitar
 Jerry Deaton – keyboards
 Charley Drayton – drums
 Steve Farris – guitar
 Tommy Funderburk – background vocals
 Brian Gary – keyboards
 Claude Gaudette – keyboards, drum programming
 Tommy Girvin – guitar, background vocals
 Bob Glaub – bass guitar
 Randy Jackson – bass guitar
 John Levesque – background vocals
 Paul Mirkovich – keyboards
 Eddie Money – Synclavier, background vocals, lead vocals
 Don Schiff – bass guitar
 The Smog Tones – background vocals
 John Snyder – drums
 Glenn Symmonds – drums
 Marc Tanner – background vocals
 Jack White – drums

Production

 Allen Abrahamson – engineer
 Frank Anthony – engineer, mixing
 Michael Baird – drum programming
 Kim Bullard – engineer
 Monty Byrom – engineer, mixing, producer (3-8)
 John Corey – arranger
 Victor Deyglio – assistant engineer, second engineer
 Claude Gaudette – drum programming
 Steve Heinke – engineer
 Randy D. Jackson – executive producer, producer (1-4, 10)
 Rob Jacobs – mixing
 Fred Kelly – assistant engineer, mixing assistant
 David Leonard – mixing
 Eddie Money – producer
 Tim Nitz – assistant engineer
 Keith Olsen – engineer, mixing, producer (1, 10)
 Scott Ralston – assistant engineer
 Jim Rondinelli – engineer
 Shay Baby – engineer, mixing 
 Marc Tanner – producer (2, 9)
 David Thoener – engineer, mixing
 Wally Traugott – mastering
 Christopher Zerbe – assistant engineer, second engineer

Charts

References

1991 albums
Eddie Money albums
Albums produced by Keith Olsen
Columbia Records albums